Wyers is a surname. Notable people with the surname include:

Alick Wyers (1907–1980), English cricketer
Fred Wyers (1932–2006), English and Canadian athlete
Juliet Wyers, American singer-songwriter

See also
Byers (surname)
Wyer
Wijers
Weijers